Baron Pyotr Nikolayevich Wrangel (April 25, 1928), also known by his nickname the Black Baron, was a Russian officer of Baltic German origin in the Imperial Russian Army. During the later stages of the Russian Civil War, he was commanding general of the anti-Bolshevik White Army in Southern Russia. After his side lost the civil war in 1920, he left Russia. He was known as one of the most prominent exiled White émigrés and commander-in-chief of South Russia.

Family
Wrangel was born in Novalexandrovsk, Kovno Governorate in the Russian Empire (now Zarasai, Lithuania) as the son of Baron  (1847–1923) and Maria Dimitrievna Demetieva-Maikova (1856–1944). The Baltic German noble Wrangel family was part of the Uradel (old nobility), the family was of German origin, appearing in the old "Livland" with the German Order. It has a common origin with the noble family von  and von . Pyotr Nikolayevich Wrangel was only distantly related to the famed Arctic explorer Ferdinand von Wrangel and the Prussian Generalfeldmarschall Friedrich von Wrangel.

Early life
After graduating from the Rostov Technical High School in 1896 and the Institute of Mining in St. Petersburg in 1901, Wrangel volunteered for the prestigious Life Guards cavalry. He soon resigned his commission and traveled to Irkutsk, where he was assigned to special missions by the Governor-General.

Military career

At the start of the Russo-Japanese War in February 1904, he re-enlisted and was assigned to the 2nd Regiment of the Transbaikal Cossack Corps. In December 1904, he was promoted to the rank of lieutenant. 

After the war ended, in January 1906, he was reassigned to the 55th Finland Dragoon Regiment, which, under General A. N. Orlov, took part in pacifying rebels in Siberia. In 1907, he returned to the Life Guards Cavalry Regiment. In 1908, he married Olga Mikhaylovna Ivanenko in St. Petersburg, and they had two sons and two daughters. Wrangel graduated from the Nicholas Imperial General Staff Academy in 1910 and the Cavalry Officers' School in 1911.

With the start of World War I, Wrangel was promoted to captain and assigned command of a cavalry squadron. On October 13, 1914, he became one of the first Russian officers to be awarded the Order of St. George (4th degree) in the war, the highest military decoration of the Russian Empire. In December 1914, he was promoted to the rank of colonel. In October 1915, Wrangel was transferred to the Southwestern Front and was appointed commander of the 1st Regiment of the Transbaikal Cossacks.

The unit was very active in Galicia against the Austrians, and Wrangel distinguished himself especially during the Brusilov Offensive. He was promoted to the rank of major general in January 1917 and took command of the 2nd Brigade of the Ussuri Cavalry Division, which was merged with other cavalry units to become the Consolidated Cavalry Corps in July that year. He was further decorated with the George Cross (4th degree) for his defense of the Zbruch River in the summer of 1917.

Russian Civil War
After the end of Russia's participation in the war, Wrangel resigned his commission and went to live at his dacha at Yalta, in the Crimea. Arrested by the Bolsheviks at the end of 1917, he was released and escaped to Kiev, where he joined Pavlo Skoropadskyi's Ukrainian State. However, it was soon apparent to him that the new government existed only because of the waning support of Germany, and in August 1918, he joined the anti-Bolshevik Volunteer Army based at Yekaterinodar, where he was given command of the 1st Cavalry Division and the rank of major general in the White movement. After the Second Kuban Campaign in late 1918, he was promoted to lieutenant general, and his division’s strength was raised to that of a corps.

In August 1918, Wrangel joined Denikin's anti-Bolshevik army.  In December 1918, Wrangel became Anton Denikin's Chief of Staff in the Armed Forces of South Russia, and in January 1919, commander of the Caucasian Volunteer Army within those forces.

According to Peter Kenez, "Wrangel fought well, but even during his first weeks with the army, he distinguished himself by his arrogant behavior." After defeating the Bolsheviks in the Northern Caucasus, Denikin wanted to move against Tsaritsyn, but the Bolshevik threat to the west of the Don district forced Denikin to send troops to that Don front. According to Kenez, "General Wrangel bitterly criticized Denikin's decision. He was willing to accept not only the loss of the Donets basin, but of the entire Don Voisko because he believed strongly that no goal could be more important than meeting Kolchak's advance somewhere along the Volga river."

Wrangel gained a reputation as a skilled and just administrator, who, unlike some other White Army generals, did not tolerate lawlessness or looting by his troops. However, after he was unable to join forces with Admiral Kolchak and at the insistence of Denikin, he led his forces north towards Moscow on a failed attempt by the Whites to take it in autumn 1919. Continuing disagreement with Denikin led to his removal from command, and Wrangel departed for exile to Constantinople on February 8, 1920.

However, Denikin was forced to resign on March 20, 1920, and a military committee, led by General Abram Dragomirov in Sevastopol, asked for Wrangel's return as Commander-in-Chief of the White forces in Crimea. He assumed that post on April 4, 1920, at the head of the Russian Army, and he put forth a coalition government that attempted to institute sweeping reforms (including land reforms). He also recognized and established relations with the new (and short-lived) anti-Bolshevik independent republics, the Ukrainian People's Republic and the Democratic Republic of Georgia, among others.

However, by that stage in the Russian Civil War, such measures were too late, and the White movement was rapidly losing support, both domestically and overseas.
Wrangel is immortalized by the nickname of "Black Baron" in the marching song The Red Army is the Strongest, composed as a rallying call for a final effort on the part of the Bolsheviks to end the war. The song was immensely popular in the early Soviet Union in the 1920s.

From June to October 1920, General Wrangel kept a building in Melitopol as his headquarters. The site later became the Melitopol Museum of Local History.

After being severely outnumbered and facing defeat in Northern Tavria and in Crimea, Wrangel organised a mass evacuation on the shores of the Black Sea. Wrangel gave every officer, soldier, and civilian the choice to evacuate and go with him into the unknown, or to remain in Russia. Those who chose to stay in Crimea were subject to brutal repression by the Bolsheviks as part of the Red Terror, along with many civilians, with up to 150,000 murdered. Wrangel evacuated the White forces from the Crimea in 1920; the remnants of the Russian Imperial Navy became known as Wrangel's fleet. The last military and civilian personnel left Russia with Wrangel on board the General Kornilov on November 14, 1920.

Initially, Wrangel lived on his yacht, Lucullus, at Constantinople. It was rammed and sunk by the Italian steamer Adria, which had sailed from Soviet-held Batum. Wrangel, then on shore, escaped with his life in what was widely regarded as an assassination attempt.

Emigration
In 1922, he moved to the Kingdom of Serbs, Croats and Slovenes as the head of all White Russian refugees. He arguably was considered the most prominent of all White émigrés.

In 1924, in the Serbian town of Sremski Karlovci, he established the Russian All-Military Union, a civilian organisation that was designed to embrace all Russian military émigrés all over the world. He tried to preserve a Russian military organisation for another fight against Bolshevism. 

In September 1927, Wrangel and his family emigrated, settling in Brussels, Belgium, where he worked as a mining engineer. 

Wrangel published his memoirs in the magazine White Cause (Белое дело) in Berlin in 1928.

Death and burial
Wrangel died suddenly on April 25, 1928, possibly after contracting typhus. His family, however, believed that he had been poisoned by his butler's brother, who briefly lived in the household in Brussels and was allegedly a Soviet agent.

He was buried in Brussels. More than a year later, his remains were transported to Belgrade. On October 6, 1929, in a formal public ceremony, his body was reinterred in the Church of the Holy Trinity, Belgrade, the Russian church, according to his wishes.

Personal life
He was married to Russian noblewoman Olga Mikhailovna Ivanienko (1883–1968). They had two sons and two daughters:
Baroness Helena Petrovna Wrangel (1909–1999); married Baron Fedor von Meyendorff: married secondly to Phillip Hills; had issue
Baron Peter Petrovich Wrangel (1911–1999); no issue
Baroness Nathalie Petrovna Wrangel (1913–2013); married to Russian nobleman Alexis George Basilevski; had issue
Baron Alexis Petrovich Wrangel (1922–2005); married to Ekaterina Nikolaevna von Lambsdorff; no issue

Legacy
The town of Sremski Karlovci, which had served as his headquarters after he emigrated from Russia, erected a monument in his honour in 2007. At the time of his death, it was the location of the Holy Synod of the Russian Orthodox Church Outside of Russia (ROCOR, which is now based in New York) and the Russian Ministry of Culture. 

During the Russian Civil War, the combat song of the Red Army, White Army, Black Baron, was named for Wrangel, and its first verse identifies Wrangel as both the leader of the Whites and a serious threat to the success of Soviet Russia.

Many Russian officers regarded Wrangel so highly that he had almost a semi-sacred status. After Hitler's invasion of the Soviet Union in June 1941, some prominent military émigrés referred to the position that they believed Wrangel would have taken. For example, Major General Mikhail Mikhailovich Zinkevich said in mid-August 1941, "If General Wrangel were alive today, he would go unhesitatingly with the Germans".

In 2015, the government of the Russian Federation began to repatriate the remains of White Emigres that were buried abroad, but the descendants of Wrangel refused to have his remains returned to Russia as the current Russian government had not "condemned the evil [of Bolshevism]," referring to Vladimir Putin's unwillingness to denounce the Soviet crimes and implement a proper decommunization.

He was portrayed by Russian actor Aleksandr Galibin in the first season of the Serbian television series Balkan Shadows, which features Wrangel's Cossack emigres as major characters. 

In September 2021, following the withdrawal of U.S. troops from Afghanistan, in an opinion piece in The Wall Street Journal, Wrangel's grandson Peter A. Basilevsky compared the "bureaucratic incompetence" of the U.S. government in Afghanistan to the successful November 1920 evacuation of 150,000 anti-Bolshevik soldiers and civilians under Wrangel which became possible with far inferior resources of the White Army and in the face of the advancing Red Army.

Honours
 Order of St. Anne 4th class, 4 July 1904
 Order of St. Anne 3rd class, 9 May 1906
 Order of St. Stanislaus 3rd class, with swords and bow, 6 January 1906.
 Order of St. Stanislaus 2nd class, 6 December 1912
 Order of St. George, 4th class, 13 October 1914
 Order of St Vladimir, 4th class with swords and bow, 24 October 1914
 Golden Sword of St George "for courage", 10 June 1915
 Order of St Vladimir, 3rd class with swords, 8 December 1915
 Cross of St. George, 4th class, 24 July 1917
Order of Saint Nicholas Thaumaturgus, 2nd degree
Papal Order of the Holy Sepulchre of Jerusalem, 1920

See also
List of unsolved deaths
Russian Civil War
White Army, Black Baron
White movement
Wrangel's fleet

References

Sources
 Lincoln, W. Bruce. Red Victory: A History of the Russian Civil War. New York, Simon and Schuster, 1989. 
Luckett, Richard. The White Generals: An Account of the White Movement and the Russian Civil War. New York, Viking, 1971. 
Robinson, P. (1999). "Always with Honour": The Code of the White Russian Officers. Canadian Slavonic Papers / Revue Canadienne Des Slavistes, 41(2), pp. 121-141. Retrieved February 16, 2020.
Williams, H. (1928). General Wrangel. The Slavonic and East European Review, 7(19), pp. 198-204. Retrieved February 16, 2020.
Wrangel, Alexis. General Wrangel - Russia's White Crusader, London, 1987 (reprint 1990) 
Wrangel, Peter N. Always With Honour: Memoirs of General Wrangel. Robert Speller & Sons. New York. 1957 (Originally published in 1928).
Wrangel, Peter N. Always With Honour: The Memoirs of General Wrangel, Mystery Grove Publishing. 2020

External links

Books

1878 births
1928 deaths
Baltic-German people
Saint Petersburg Mining University alumni
Imperial Russian Army generals
Eastern Orthodox Christians from Lithuania
Members of the Russian Orthodox Church
People of the Russian Civil War
Russian anti-communists
Russian All-Military Union members
Russian exiles
Russian military personnel of the Russo-Japanese War
Russian military personnel of World War I
Russian monarchists
People from the Russian Empire of German descent
Barons of the Russian Empire
Russian Provisional Government generals
People from Novoalexandrovsky Uyezd
People from Zarasai District Municipality
Recipients of the Cross of St. George
Recipients of the Gold Sword for Bravery
Recipients of the Order of Saint Stanislaus (Russian), 2nd class
Recipients of the Order of St. Anna, 3rd class
Recipients of the Order of St. Vladimir, 3rd class
White movement generals
White Russian emigrants to Belgium
White Russian emigrants to Turkey
White Russian emigrants to Yugoslavia
Wrangel's fleet
Unsolved deaths
Pyotr